Doba is a Central Sudanic language of Chad. It is traditionally considered three languages, because it is spoken by three ethnicities with separate identities, the Bedjond, the Mango, and the Gor. However, all have a high degree of mutual intelligibility, and so by that standard are a single language.

Doba is the name of the town which is the center of the Mango people, and is used by linguists as a cover term for the three dialects.

The number of speakers is uncertain, as the latest figure for the Bedjond, 36,000, dates from 1969. Figures for the Gor (87,000) and Mango (52,000) date from 2006.

Bedjond is also spelled Bediondo and Bejondo, and is also known as Bediondo Mbai, Mbay Bejondo, and Nangnda. Dialects are Bedjond, Bébote, and Yom.

Gor is also known as Bodo; Bodo and Yamod are dialects.

Mango is also known as Mongo, Doba, and Mbay Doba.

References
The Sara-Bagirmi Language Project -- Mango
The Sara-Bagirmi Language Project -- Gor
The Sara-Bagirmi Language Project -- Bebote

Bongo–Bagirmi languages
Languages of Chad